William James Conroy (born December 8, 1982) is an American professional basketball player and coach.

Amateur career
Conroy attended and played competitively at Garfield High School in Seattle, and played college basketball at the University of Washington. Conroy is the all-time assists leader in Washington Huskies history, with 515.

Pro career
Conroy played in the 2006–07 NBA preseason with the Charlotte Bobcats, but he was cut before the NBA regular season started. He then signed with the Tulsa 66ers of the NBA D-League. On January 30, 2007, Conroy was signed to a ten-day contract by the Memphis Grizzlies after they had opened up a roster spot by waiving guard Eddie Jones.

After his contract ended, Conroy returned to the 66ers. On February 28, 2007, Conroy was signed to another ten-day contract by the Los Angeles Clippers, following point guard Shaun Livingston's season-ending knee injury. The team waived Von Wafer to make room on their roster for Conroy.

However, after averaging two assists in four games played, he was waived. On April 6, he was re-signed by the Clippers, who made room on their roster by waiving Željko Rebrača. Conroy then played in the Italian league with both Virtus Bologna and Olimpia Milano and in the Euroleague with Virtus Bologna, where he averaged 7.8 points and 3.2 assists per game during the 2007–08 season.

He then played with the NBA D-League clubs the Albuquerque Thunderbirds and the Rio Grande Valley Vipers. In 2009, he tied Morris Almond's D-League single-game record with 53 points, but this was surpassed by Pierre Jackson in 2014 (58). He was called up by the Houston Rockets from the Vipers on January 29, 2010 on a 10-day contract, and returned to the Vipers when the contract expired on February 8. Conroy was again recalled by the Rockets on March 2, 2010, and sent back to the Vipers on March 11, 2010.

In January 2011 he signed with Oyak Renault in Bursa, Turkey. In January 2012, he rejoined the Rio Grande Valley Vipers. In September 2012, Conroy signed with the Minnesota Timberwolves. He was waived on November 15, 2012, after appearing in four games.

Despite being waived, Conroy remained with the Timberwolves that season as a member of their scouting staff. It was reported that he was not retiring from his playing career, but merely putting it on hold.

In December 2013, he signed with Medi Bayreuth. In February 2014 his contract was not extended and he left the team. Instead Conroy decided to sign with the German team SC Rasta Vechta for the remainder of the season.

Coaching career
On June 4, 2015, Conroy was named as an assistant basketball coach at the University of Washington under head coach Lorenzo Romar.

On March 22, 2017, new University of Washington head coach Mike Hopkins announced that Conroy will remain on the coaching staff following the firing of Romar.

On August 17, 2022 Conroy was promoted to associate head coach at the University of Washington.

Career statistics

NBA

Source

Regular season

|-
| align="left" | 
| align="left" | Memphis
| 3 || 0 || 5.7 || – || – || – || .7 || .3 || .0 || .0 || .0
|-
| align="left" | 
| align="left" | L.A. Clippers
| 4 || 0 || 8.8 || .000 || – || .000 || 1.3 || 2.0 || .0 || .0 || .0
|-
| align="left" | 
| align="left" | Houston
| 5 || 0 || 7.2 || .300 || .000 || .000 || .6 || 1.4 || .0 || .0 || 1.2
|-
| align="left" | 
| align="left" | Minnesota
| 4 || 0 || 5.0 || .000 || .000 || .500 || .3 || .0 || .0 || .0 || .3
|-
| align="left" | Career
| align="left" |
| 16 || 0 || 6.7 || .136 || .000 || .125 || .7 || 1.0 || .0 || .0 || .4

References

External links

NBA.com Profile
Euroleague.net Profile
NBA D-League Profile
NBA Stats
Basketball Bundesliga (Germany) Profile

1982 births
Living people
Albuquerque Thunderbirds players
American expatriate basketball people in China
American expatriate basketball people in Germany
American expatriate basketball people in Italy
American expatriate basketball people in Turkey
American men's basketball players
Basketball players from Seattle
Garfield High School (Seattle) alumni
Houston Rockets players
Los Angeles Clippers players
Medi Bayreuth players
Memphis Grizzlies players
Minnesota Timberwolves players
Olimpia Milano players
Oyak Renault basketball players
Point guards
Rio Grande Valley Vipers players
SC Rasta Vechta players
Shenzhen Leopards players
Tulsa 66ers players
Undrafted National Basketball Association players
Virtus Bologna players
Washington Huskies men's basketball players